The Story in Temple Red Lily (Mandarin: 火燒紅蓮寺 Pinyin: Huǒshāo hónglián sì) is a 1976 Hong Kong historical drama-martial arts film produced by Hoh Kwok-Keung and Wong Ming and directed by Karl Liao Chiang-Lin. It stars Chia Ling, Dorian Tan Tao-liang, and Lung Fei in lead roles.

Plot 
The Story in Temple Red Lily tells the tale of how the Shaolin Temple came under the control of those who wished to take over the Chinese government during the Sung Dynasty.

Production notes 
The film was shot in Taiwan.

External links 
 

Hong Kong martial arts films
1976 martial arts films
1976 films
1970s Hong Kong films